Mariana Mihaylova Kotzeva (born 12 March 1967) is a Bulgarian statistician and econometrician. Since the beginning of 2017 she has been the acting director-general of Eurostat, the directorate-general of the European Commission responsible for providing statistical information to the institutions of the European Union and for harmonizing statistical methods across the Union. She is also the former president of the National Statistical Institute of Bulgaria.

Early life and education
Kotzeva was born in Byala, Ruse Province.
She earned a master's degree in economics in 1985 (specializing in economic statistics) from the University of National and World Economy in Sofia, Bulgaria. She earned a second master's degree in economics in 1993, from the Central European University in Prague under its charter from the University of the State of New York. In 1995 she completed a Ph.D. in economics, specializing in statistics and demography, from the University of National and World Economy.

Career
Since 2003 Kotzeva has been on the faculty of the University of National and World Economy. Additionally, before joining Eurostat in 2014, she has worked for
the Serbian Ministry of Labour and Employment,
the United Nations Development Programme,
the Bulgarian Ministry of Labour and Social Policy,
and the National Statistical Institute of Bulgaria.
She was the head of the National Statistical Institute from 2008 to 2012.

In 2012, she joined Eurostat as "adviser hors classe".
She replaced  as acting director-general in 2017.

References

1967 births
Living people
20th-century Bulgarian economists
Bulgarian statisticians
Bulgarian women economists
Bulgarian women mathematicians
Women statisticians
University of National and World Economy alumni
Central European University alumni
21st-century Bulgarian economists